The 1946 North American Soccer Football League season featured a 20-match schedule from 7 June to 1 September, with all five teams playing eight matches each. The Detroit Wolverines clinched the title on 24 August after rivals Toronto lost their second-last match of the season. Toronto won their last game of the season over Detroit on 25 August, but still finished one point back in the standings. Detroit and Toronto were then scheduled to meet in a two-match playoff, with Toronto winning the first match on 21 September. Detroit claimed that they did not want to complete the series since they had already won the league's championship.

League standings

Final:  Toronto defeated Detroit 3-0, __-__.

See also
1947 North American Soccer Football League season

References

North American Soccer Football League seasons
North American Soccer Football League, 1946